Haziqul Khairi (born November 5, 1931) is a Pakistani jurist and author who served as Chief Justice of the Federal Shariat Court of Pakistan, Judge of the Sindh High Court, Ombudsman of Sindh and Principal of Sindh Muslim Law College. He is the grandson of eminent British India social reformer, Allama Rashid ul Khairi.

Khairi also served as Member of the Council of Islamic Ideology where as Chairman Legal Committee he drafted the Women's Protection Bill. Founder of the private law firm H. Khairi Law Associates, Khairi before his appointment as a Judge of the Sindh High Court was practising as Advocate of the Supreme Court of Pakistan.

Personal life and education
Khairi was born in Delhi on November 5, 1931, into a literary family to Raziq-ul-Khairi and Begum Amina Nazli. Khairi's grandfather was Allama Rashid-ul-Khairi, a social reformer of British India and a reputed writer of Urdu Language. Khairi is the father-in-law of senior civil servant Rizwan Ahmed.

Khairi initially got education in Delhi but later on studied in Karachi after Khairi's family migrated after independence of Pakistan. He graduated in arts in 1954 and obtained his Bachelor of Laws degree from Sindh Muslim Law College in 1956. Khairi also holds a master's degree in political science.

Other contributions
Khairi has written several plays and short stories over the years. His autobiography, Jaagtey Lamhey, composed by the young energetic IT Professional Mr. Shahid Mehmood Shahid on Google was published in 2012. Khairi is the chairman of the Thinker's Forum at Hamdard Shura Karachi and serves on the Board of Governors of Habib University. He has previously served on the board of governors, board of trustees, council of trustees and selection board of the International Islamic University.

See also
 Chief Justice of the Federal Shariat Court
 Federal Shariat Court
 Sindh Muslim Law College

References

Muhajir people
Pakistani judges
Living people
University of Karachi alumni
Chief justices of the Federal Shariat Court
1931 births
Academic staff of Sindh Muslim Law College